Vega Redonda is a hamlet in Encrucijada, Cuba.

Geography
Vega Redonda is in the ward of La Sierra. It is also near the Sagua la Chica River.

Environmental issues
In 2018, a flood from the Sagua la Chica River happened. Vega Redonda, Pavón, El Santo, Siete Pazos and others had a total of a thousand people evacuated, according to Eduardo Monteagudo, President of Encrucijada and Alberto López Díaz, President of Villa Clara Province, making it the most affected towns in Villa Clara.

History
Vega Redonda was a former barrio of Encrucijada.

References

Populated places in Villa Clara Province